Tully Alicia Jacqueline Kearney  (born 11 April 1997) is a British Paralympic swimmer. Kearney competes in the S6, SB5, SM6 classification for swimmers with physical disabilities. She won Gold and Silver at the Tokyo 2020 Paralympic Games setting World records in both the 50 m and 100 m freestyle. She has also won medals in three IPC Swimming World Championships winning Bronze in the 2013 IPC Swimming World Championships, setting a British record; four Golds, a Silver and a Bronze in the 2015 World Championships setting three European records and becoming GB's highest medal earner of the Championships, and three Golds at the World Para Swimming Championships in 2019, setting three British records and two Championship records.  In addition, she won Gold and Bronze at the World Para Swimming European Championships in 2018.  Kearney is a multiple British, European and World record holder.

Personal history
Kearney was born in Nottingham, England in 1997 and grew up in Aldridge. She was born with cerebral palsy (spastic diplegia) and developed generalised dystonia, a progressive neurological movement disorder, in her mid teens.  These conditions primarily affect her lower limbs and also her left arm, shoulders and trunk control. Kearney was further diagnosed with scoliosis in 2019.  She attended The Cooper and Jordan School in Aldridge, where one of her fellow pupils was future Paralympic gold medalist Ellie Simmonds. She continued her education at the Royal Wolverhampton School. Kearney studied for her A-Levels at The Streetly Academy. She has graduated with a BSc (Hons) degree in physiology from Manchester Metropolitan University, where she is now studying for a master's degree in human physiology.  She is Patron of Dystonia UK and works to raise awareness of this rare progressive neurological movement disorder.

Career history
Kearney began swimming at the age of eight, after being approached by a coach while she watched her older brother train at a local club. She decided to take up swimming competitively after being inspired when Ellie Simmonds displayed her Paralympic medals at a school assembly. Kearney joined Boldmere Swimming Club in 2010 and was coached by Ashley Cox. Classified as a S10, SB9, SM10, at the age of 14 she was competing nationally in youth competitions winning gold in seven events at the DSE (Disability Sports Events) Championships in Sheffield.

2011 also saw Kearney selected for her first international competition was at the 25th German Open Meet in Berlin. In her age group events she took seven medals, and followed this with silvers in and S10 200m and 400m freestyles and gold in the SM10 200m individual medley in the open age events. The 2011/12 season saw Kearney selected as a World Class Development Funded Athlete, by British Disability Swimming, under the coaching of Nathan Hilton. At the 2013 British International Disability Swim Championships held in Sheffield, Kearney twice broke the British record for the 100m S10 backstroke, during the heats and then again in the final. She also recorded personal bests in three other events. Her performance on that day won her a place in the British Team taking part in the 2013 IPC Swimming World Championships in Montreal. At Montreal, Kearney entered five different events and won bronze in the Women's 400m Freestyle S10 behind France's Elodie Lorandi and Canada's Aurelie Rivard.

An illness during British trials in 2014, saw Kearney miss out on a place for both the Commonwealth Games at Glasgow and the European Championships in Eindhoven. She returned to swimming, competing in the National Paralympic Day swimming event at the London Aquatics Centre, winning the multi-classification 400m freestyle. She followed this with being awarded Junior Sportsperson of the Year at the Birmingham Sports Awards 2014, an award special to her as it was contended by both able-bodied and parasport athletes. In 2019 Kearney was named Birmingham Amateur Sportsperson of the Year and was awarded a Pride of Sport Award in recognition of her fight to return to competitive swimming following the sudden and significant progression of her Generalised Dystonia at the end of 2015 which led to her having to take a significant period of time out of the water and then having to learn to swim again.

In 2015 Kearney qualified to represent Great Britain at the 2015 IPC Swimming World Championships held in Glasgow. Due to her progressive disability, Kearney was reclassified before the trials as a S9, SB8, SM9 swimmer. She was entered into seven events, including the freestyle relay and medley relay team events. She took home six medals in total, with golds in the medley relay, 100m butterfly (S9), 200m individual medley (SM9) and 400m freestyle (S9). Kearney also finished second in the 100m backstroke S9, behind a world record breaking swim by Australia's Ellie Cole, and took bronze in the freestyle relay. Her gold in the 400m freestyle saw Kearney set a new European record with a time of 4:39.29, over ten seconds ahead of her silver placed rival, Nuria Marques Soto of Spain. Kearney also set a European record in the 100m butterfly, recording a time of 1:09.04. Her third European record was in the 200m individual medley in which she posted a time of 2:31.08. She was Great Britain's highest medal earner at these championships and following this success was moved from the World Class Podium Potential programme to the Podium programme for the 2015–2016 season. Kearney finished 2015 by making the final three athletes shortlisted for the BBC Young Sports Personality of the Year at the 2015 BBC Sports Personality of the Year Award.

In 2016 Kearney was selected for the Paralympic Games in Rio, but was forced to withdraw shortly before the games due to battling a significant progression of her Generalised Dystonia, coupled with an ongoing shoulder injury.

Kearney returned to the pool in 2017 and was reclassified at the British Para Swimming International Meet in April 2017 to the S7, SB6, SM7 due to this further progression in her disability.

In 2018 under the revised World Para Swimming Classification system Kearney was reclassified to the S5, SB4, SM5 classification and returned to international competition at the World Para Swimming European Championships in Dublin where she won gold in the S5 100 metre freestyle and bronze in the S5 50 metre freestyle.  She ended the year ranked number 1 in the World in three events.  In recognition of her success she was reinstated onto the World Class Podium Potential Programme for the 2018–2019 season.

In 2019 Kearney competed at the World Para Swimming World Championships in London where she became triple World Champion winning gold in the S5 50 metre freestyle, 100 metre freestyle and 200 m freestyle all in British record times.  She again ended the year ranked number 1 in the World in these three events.  In recognition of this success she was moved to the World Class Podium Programme for the 2019–2020 season.

In July 2021 she was named as part of the GB team to compete at the postponed 2020 Summer Paralympics in Tokyo, where she won gold in the 100m freestyle S5 and silver in the 200m freestyle S5.

Kearney was appointed Member of the Order of the British Empire (MBE) in the 2022 New Year Honours for services to swimming.

References

External links 
 
 
 

1997 births
Living people
Cerebral Palsy category Paralympic competitors
English female freestyle swimmers
British female medley swimmers
British female butterfly swimmers
Medalists at the 2020 Summer Paralympics
Medalists at the World Para Swimming Championships
Medalists at the World Para Swimming European Championships
Paralympic silver medalists for Great Britain
Paralympic medalists in swimming
Paralympic swimmers of Great Britain
Sportspeople from Nottingham
Swimmers at the 2020 Summer Paralympics
Swimmers with cerebral palsy
Members of the Order of the British Empire
S5-classified Paralympic swimmers
21st-century British women